The Estonia men's national under-18 basketball team is a national basketball team of Estonia, administered by the Eesti Korvpalliliit. It represents the country in international men's under-18 basketball competitions.

FIBA U18 European Championship participations

See also
Estonia men's national basketball team
Estonia men's national under-16 basketball team
Estonia women's national under-18 basketball team

References

External links
Official website 
Archived records of Estonia team participations

Basketball in Estonia
National sports teams of Estonia
Men's national under-18 basketball teams